The Shreveport Fire Station #8, at 3406 Velva St. in Shreveport, Louisiana, was built in 1925.  Also known as the Velva Street Station, it was listed on the National Register of Historic Places in 2000.

It is a two-story stuccoed Spanish Colonial Revival-style building, and has a red tile roof. It was designed by architect Clarence W. King.

The land was given to local Willis Knighton hospital as part of a land swap, and is no longer used to store active firefighting equipment.

See also  
 Central Fire Station (Shreveport, Louisiana)
 Shreveport Fire Station No. 10
 National Register of Historic Places listings in Caddo Parish, Louisiana

References

Fire stations on the National Register of Historic Places in Louisiana
National Register of Historic Places in Caddo Parish, Louisiana
Fire stations completed in 1925
1925 establishments in Louisiana
Spanish Colonial Revival architecture in the United States
Buildings and structures in Shreveport, Louisiana